A value menu (not to be confused with a value meal) is a group of menu items at a fast food restaurant that are designed to be the least expensive items available. In the US, the items are usually priced between $0.99 and $2.99. The portion size, and number of items included with the food, are typically related to the price.

Examples

Arby's
Arby's announced the launch of their value menu on April 9, 2010.  Items on the value menu vary based on location, but typically include small or value size roast beef sandwiches, curly fries, milkshakes, chicken sandwiches, ham and cheddar sandwiches, and turnovers.

Burger King
Burger King added a value menu in 1998 with items priced at 99¢ (USD),  . In 2002 and 2006, BK revamped its value menu, adding and removing products at 99¢, and later increasing some prices to $1.39. Many of these items have since been discontinued, modified or relegated to a regional menu option. The Burger King Whopper was the very first 99 cent burger and it revolutionized the 99 cent menu in the fast food industry.

McDonald's
After numerous attempts beginning in 1991, experimenting with a variety of menus and pricing strategies, McDonald's launched its first national value menu, the Dollar Menu, in late 2002 in the United States.

The latest iteration was rolled out on January 4, 2018 in the United States. It features a dozen items at various price points: $1, $2 and $3, with four items per price point. It no longer featured fries, which was criticized by Good Mythical Morning along with the lack of items at the $1 price point. In Canada, fries are available for CA$1.59 on the Value Picks menu.

Subway

Subway currently offers a $4.99 footlong menu in the United States. The promotion began in 2004 as a $5 footlong menu.

Taco Bell
In 1988, Taco Bell lowered the prices of all new items and launched the first three-tiered pricing strategy and free drink refills. In 2010, Taco Bell introduced the $2 Meal Deals menu, featuring a menu item (i.e., a chicken burrito, a beefy 5-layer burrito, a double decker taco, or a Gordita supreme), a bag of Doritos, and a medium drink. On August 18, 2014, Taco Bell launched a new value menu called Dollar Cravings that included eleven food items each priced a $1.

On December 15, 2017, Taco Bell launched an advertising campaign called "The Belluminati" to advertise its Dollar Cravings menu.

Wendy's
Wendy's is generally credited with being the first fast food chain to offer a value menu in October 1989, with every item priced at $0.99. However, the general price for value menu items is now around $1.55.

References

External links
Fast Food Steps Up Value Menus. Bruce Horovitz, January 11, 2006. USA Today, Money.

Restaurant menus
Fast food